Chandan Kar (born 16 September) is an Ollywood actor and IT Professional from the state of Odisha in India.
He made his debut in the film Babu I Love You in 2006.

Film career
Kar was inexperienced before acting in his first movie, Babu I Love You, in 2006.

He was also featured in the movie De Maa Shakti De in the same year.

Filmography

Off-screen work 

Kar is an active member and counselor of the NGO named Save Indian Family Foundation (SIFF) since the year 2007. 

Kar has adopted two tigers through the "Adopt an Animal" program of Nandankanan Zoological Park located at Bhubaneswar, Odisha.

Later, Kar also joined the organization People For Animals PFA, Bhubaneswar.

To promote eye donation in the State and raise awareness, Chandan has donated his eyes with the help of Drushti Daan eyebank.

Awards and accreditation

References

External links 

 
 www.welcomeorissa.com profile

1981 births
Living people
Indian male film actors
Ollywood
Male actors in Odia cinema
Male actors from Odisha
People from Cuttack
Cinema of Odisha
21st-century Indian male actors